Salomé is a 2013 American drama film edited from the 2011 film Wilde Salomé, written and directed by Al Pacino, and starring Pacino and Jessica Chastain. It was released theatrically on August 10, 2013 in the United States and on September 21, 2014 in the United Kingdom and Ireland.

The film is a companion piece to Pacino's Wilde Salomé, an experimental film which featured a documentary (mixed with dramatic performances) based on Oscar Wilde's 1891 play of the same name. Salomé presents instead the narrative and drama elements of the first film in its full form.

Cast
 Jessica Chastain as Salomé
 Al Pacino as King Herod
 Kevin Anderson as John the Baptist
 Roxanne Hart as Queen Herodias

References

External links 
 
 

2013 films
2013 drama films
Films directed by Al Pacino
Films based on the Gospels
Cultural depictions of John the Baptist
Films based on Salome (play)
American drama films
2010s English-language films
2010s American films